A liburna was a type of small galley used for raiding and patrols. It was originally used by the Liburnians, a pirate tribe from Dalmatia, and later used by the Roman navy.

History

A stone tablet (Stele di Novilara) found near ancient Pisaurum (now Pesaro) shows a liburna in the scene of a naval battle. Dated to the fifth or sixth century BCE, the image possibly depicts an imaginary battle between the Liburnian and Picene fleets. The liburna was presented as light type of the ship with one row of oars, one mast, one sail, and prow twisted outwards. Under the prow there was a rostrum made for striking the enemy ships under the sea.

By its original form, the liburna was similar to the ancient Greek penteconter. It had one bench with 25 oars on each side, while in the late Roman Republic, it was equipped with two banks of oars (a bireme), remaining faster, lighter, and more agile than triremes. The liburna design was adopted by the Romans and became a key part of the Roman navy, most possibly by mediation of the Macedonian navy in the second half of the 1st century BCE. Liburnae played a key role in the Battle of Actium in Greece (31 BCE), which saw the establishment of Augustus as the undisputed ruler of the Roman world.
 
Liburnae were different from the battle triremes, quadriremes and quinqueremes not because of rowing but rather because of its specific constructional features. Two rows of oarsmen pulled 18 oars per side. The ship could make up to 14 knots under sail and more than 7 under oars.

Such a vessel, used as a merchantman, might take on a passenger, as Lycinus relates in the second-century dialogue Love Affairs (§6), traditionally attributed to Lucian: "I had a speedy vessel readied, the kind of bireme used above all by the Liburnians of the Ionian Gulf."

Once the Romans had adopted the liburna, they proceeded to make a few adaptations to improve the ships’ use within the navy. The benefits gained from the addition of rams and protection from missiles more than made-up for the slight loss of speed. Besides the construction, the ships required that the regular Roman military unit be simplified in order to function more smoothly. Each ship operated as an individual entity, so the more complicated organization normally used was not necessary. Within the navy, there were probably liburnae of several varying sizes, all put to specific tasks such as scouting and patrolling Roman waters against piracy. The Romans made use of the liburna particularly within the provinces of the empire, where the ships formed the bulk of the fleets, while it was included by small numbers in fleets of Ravenna and Misenum, where a large number of the Illyrians were serving, especially Dalmatae, Liburnians and Pannonians.

Gradually liburnae became a general name for the different types of the Roman ships, attached also to cargo ships in late antiquity. Tacitus and Suetonius were using it as a synonym for the battle ship. In inscriptions it was mentioned as the last in a class of battleships: hexeres, penteres, quadrieres, trieres, liburna.

The liburna gave its name to a natural cove on the west coast of Tuscany. The cove's name was eventually transformed to Livorna and then to Livorno — the name of a significant port city which developed at that location long after this type of ship disappeared.

References

Sources

 

Ancient ships
Galleys
Illyrian warfare
Navy of ancient Rome
Liburnia
Naval warfare of antiquity